DJ-Kicks: Moodymann is a DJ mix compilation album by Moodymann. It was released as part of the DJ-Kicks series by Studio !K7 on February 19, 2016. It peaked at number 8 on the Billboard Top Dance/Electronic Albums chart, as well as number 21 on the Heatseekers Albums chart.

Critical reception

At Metacritic, which assigns a weighted average score out of 100 to reviews from mainstream critics, the album received an average score of 83, based on 9 reviews, indicating "universal acclaim".

John Paul of PopMatters gave the album 8 out of 10 stars, writing, "with the presence of so many just-off-the-map yet accessible tracks, this set serves as an entry point to a host of artists all sharing a similar aesthetic operating at different levels drawn together by an overarching understanding of how music works on multiple levels." Ashley Hampson of Exclaim! gave the album a 6 out of 10, writing, "While the artistry is evident in his picks, Moodymann's execution here could've use a more deft hand."

Rolling Stone placed it at number 2 on the "20 Best EDM and Electronic Albums of 2016" list, while Spin placed it at number 49 on the "50 Best Albums of 2016" list. Philip Sherburne of Pitchfork included it on the "20 Best Electronic Albums of 2016" list.

Track listing

Charts

References

External links
 

2016 compilation albums
DJ-Kicks albums